A Question of Time is the ninth studio album by Scottish musician Jack Bruce. The album was released on 3 October 1989 by Epic Records, his first album for a major label in nearly a decade.

Track listing 
All tracks composed by Jack Bruce and Pete Brown; except where indicated

Personnel
Jack Bruce – vocals, bass, keyboards (2,3), piano (4,11), cello (9,11), acoustic guitar (9,10), synthesizer (1,10), harmonica (6)
Jimmy Ripp (1–6,8,10–12), Vernon Reid (1), Albert Collins (6), Vivian Campbell (7), Malcolm Bruce (12) – guitar
Paul Barrere – slide guitar (4)
Allan Holdsworth – guitar (7), SynthAxe (10)
Bernie Worrell – piano (2), keyboards (3), Melodica (11), Hammond organ (4,5,12), synth (2), Clavinet (12), backing vocals (2,8,9)
Nicky Hopkins (6), Jonas Bruce (9) – piano
Dougie Bowne (1–4,6,9–12), Ginger Baker (5,7), Tony Williams (8) – drums
Mark Nauseef – Ghanaian drums (2,8,9,10), percussion (2,5,9)
Zakir Hussain – tablas (8,11)
Steve Jordan – percussion (2)
The Savage Horns – John Abernathy – saxophone (4,8,9)
Gary "Bone" Cooper – backing vocals (2,8,9,12)
The Golden Gate Boys Choir, The SoMa Footlights Chorus – choir

References

Jack Bruce albums
1989 albums
Albums produced by Jack Bruce
CBS Records albums